The 2017 MLS SuperDraft was the eighteenth SuperDraft conducted by Major League Soccer. The SuperDraft is held each year in conjunction with the annual National Soccer Coaches Association of America convention. The first two rounds of the 2017 SuperDraft were held in Los Angeles, California on January 13, 2017 as part of the NSCAA 2017 convention. Rounds three and four were held via conference call on January 17, 2017.

Format
The SuperDraft format has remained constant throughout its history and closely resembles that of the NFL Draft:

Any expansion teams receive the first picks. MLS has announced that Atlanta United FC and Minnesota United FC will begin play in 2017. As determined by a "Priority Draft" conducted on October 16, 2016, Minnesota received the first overall selection and Atlanta picked second.
Non-playoff clubs received the next picks in reverse order of prior season finish.
Teams that made the MLS Cup Playoffs were then ordered by which round of the playoffs they were eliminated.
The winners of the MLS Cup were given the last selection, and the losers the penultimate selection.

Player selection

Round 1 
Any player marked with a * is part of the Generation Adidas program.

Round 1 trades

Round 2 
Any player marked with a * is part of the Generation Adidas program.

Round 2 trades

Round 3 
Any player marked with a * is part of the Generation Adidas program.

Round 3 trades

Round 4 
Any player marked with a * is part of the Generation Adidas program.

Round 4 trades

Other 2017 SuperDraft Trade Notes
 On January 18, 2016, Colorado Rapids acquired a conditional first-round selection in the 2017 SuperDraft, a third-round selection in the 2016 MLS SuperDraft, and targeted allocation money from Toronto FC in exchange for goalkeeper Clint Irwin. Through January 5, 2017, the MLSSoccer.com 2017 SuperDraft page stated that Colorado had acquired the first-round pick from Toronto. Effective January 6, 2017, the MLSSoccer.com website stated that Toronto maintained this pick. No explanation was provided for the change.
 On May 4, 2016, Columbus Crew SC acquired a second-round selection in the 2017 SuperDraft from Chicago Fire in exchange for the MLS rights to midfielder Khaly Thiam. However, trade terms stated that should Thiam start 12 or more MLS regular-season games in 2016 the SuperDraft pick would be converted to General Allocation Money. Thiam met this threshold and Columbus received General Allocation Money.

Notable undrafted players

Homegrown players

Players who signed outside of MLS

Summary

Selections by college athletic conference

Schools with multiple draft selections

References

Major League Soccer drafts
SuperDraft
MLS SuperDraft
MLS SuperDraft
Soccer in Los Angeles
Events in Los Angeles
MLS SuperDraft